4:99 is the fifth studio album by German hip hop group Die Fantastischen Vier. It reached number one in the German as well as the Austrian and Swiss charts.

As seen before on the album Live und direkt, the CD contains a multimedia part with some gimmicks like the music video to "MfG".

Track listing
 "Und täglich grüßen Fanta Vier/Romantic Fighters" – 1:23
 "30 Mark" – 0:42
 "MfG – Mit freundlichen Grüßen" – 3:35
 "Hammer" – 4:59
 "Die Stadt, die es nicht gibt" – 4:29
 "00:29" – 0:29
 "Alles schon gesehen" – 4:25
 "Michi Beck in Hell" – 5:12
 "Home Again" – 0:44
 "Le Smou" – 4:38
 "Weiter als du denkst" – 5:22
 "Millionen Legionen" – 5:38
 "Schmock" – 4:16
 "FunkYms20" – 1:45
 "Hoffnung" – 5:05
 "Buenos Días Messias" – 4:31
 "Gute Nacht" – 0:58

Charts

Weekly charts

Year-end charts

Singles

References

External links
 Official website (in German)
 discography at Discogs

1999 albums
Die Fantastischen Vier albums